Kuitan railway station is a railway station in Kuitan Town, Huilai County, Guangdong Province, China, on the Xiamen–Shenzhen railway. The station is operated by the Guangzhou Railway (Group) Corp., China Railway Corporation.

Railway stations in Guangdong